Serocca railway station is a railway station in the municipality of Agno in the Swiss canton of Ticino. The station is on the metre gauge Lugano–Ponte Tresa railway (FLP), between Lugano and Ponte Tresa.

The station is on a section of double track line, which stretches from just south of the station to Bioggio station. It has two side platforms.

Services 
 the following services stop at Serocca:

References

External links 
 

Serocca
Ferrovie Luganesi stations